Gerrit Lundens (1622 – 1686), was a Dutch painter known for his genre scenes, miniature portraits and vanitas paintings. He also made copies after famous Dutch masters.

Biography
He was born in Amsterdam and married Agniet Mathijs of Antwerp in Sloterdijk in 1643. He is known for portraits, genre works, still lifes and copies of old masters, the most notable of which is his copy of the Night Watch in the collection of the National Gallery, London. His sister Catharina married the painter Abraham van den Hecken, also in Sloterdijk in 1635 and the painter Christoffel van Sichem was one of their witnesses.
He died in Amsterdam.

References

External links

1622 births
1686 deaths
Dutch Golden Age painters
Dutch male painters
Painters from Amsterdam